Vasastan, or Vasastaden, may refer to:

 Vasastan, Stockholm, a district in Stockholm, Sweden
 Vasastan, Gothenburg, a district in Gothenburg, Sweden
 Vasastaden, Linköping, a district in Linköping, Sweden